An electuary is a medicine consisting of a powder or other ingredient mixed with something sweet such as honey to make it more palatable.

In German and Swiss cultures, electuary ( or ) is also more generally a thickened juice and honey preparation with a thick, viscous consistency that is used in for culinary purposes, such as a (bread) spread or as a sauce ingredient.

Types
Electuary have many different types. laxative electuary, joyful electuary and etc.
Fermentation of mixed herbs in honey and their effect on each other, It increases properties and creates new properties.

Famous Electuary in medicine
 Mithridate
 Faroug
 philosophers
 Figra
 Sootira

References
 Avicenna (1999). The Canon of Medicine (al-Qānūn fī'l-ṭibb), vol. 5. translate by Abdurrahman Sharafkandi.

Medical terminology
Archaic words and phrases